This list of African-American visual artists is a list that includes dates of birth and death of historically recognized African-American fine artists known for the creation of artworks that are primarily visual in nature, including traditional media such as painting, sculpture, photography, and printmaking, as well as more recent genres, including installation art, performance art, body art, conceptual art, video art, and digital art. The entries are in alphabetical order by surname.

Artists

A–B
 Panteha Abareshi (born 1999), multidisciplinary artist
Nina Chanel Abney (born 1982), painter
Blanch Ackers (1914–2003), painter
 Terry Adkins (1953–2014), artist
 Mequitta Ahuja (born 1976), painter, installation artist
 Larry D. Alexander (born 1953), painter
 Laylah Ali (born 1968), painter
 Jules T. Allen (born 1947), photographer
 Tina Allen (1949–2008), sculptor
 Steve R. Allen (born 1954), painter
 Charles Alston (1907–1977), painter
 Amalia Amaki (born 1959), artist
 Emma Amos (1938–2020), painter
 Benny Andrews (1930–2006), painter
 Edgar Arceneaux (born 1972), drawing artist
Nellie Ashford (born c. 1943), folk artist
 James Atkins (b. 1941), painter 
 Roland Ayers (1932–2014), printmaker
 Radcliffe Bailey (born 1968) collage, sculpture
 Kyle Baker (born 1965), cartoonist
 Matt Baker (1921–1959), comic book artist
 James Presley Ball (1825–1904), photographer
 Alvin Baltrop (1948–2004), photographer
 Henry Bannarn (1910–1965), painter
 Edward Mitchell Bannister (1828–1901), painter
 Ernie Barnes (1938–2009), neo-Mannerist artist
 Richmond Barthé (1901–1989), sculptor
 Jean-Michel Basquiat (1960–1988), painter
 C. M. Battey (1873–1927), photographer
 Romare Bearden (1911–1988), painter
 Arthello Beck (1941–2004), painter
 Arthur P. Bedou (1882–1966), photographer
 Darrin Bell (born 1975), cartoonist
 Mary A. Bell (1873–1941)
 Dawoud Bey (born 1953), photographer
 Sharif Bey (born 1974), ceramist
 John T. Biggers (1924–2001), muralist
 Sanford Biggers (born 1970), interdisciplinary
 Gene Bilbrew (1923–1974), cartoonist and fetish artist
 Camille Billops (1933–2019), filmmaker, sculptor, painter, printmaker
 McArthur Binion (born 1946), painter
Robert Blackburn (1920–2003) master printmaker, lithographer, and educator.
 Thomas Blackshear (born 1955)
 Betty Blayton (1937–2016), painter, printmaker
 Chakaia Booker (born 1953), sculptor
 Edythe Boone (born 1938), muralist
 Charles Boyce (born 1949), cartoonist
 Tina Williams Brewer, fiber artist
 Michael Bramwell (born 1953), conceptual artist
 James Brantley (b. 1945), painter
 Mark Bradford (born 1961)
 Elenora "Rukiya" Brown, doll creator
 Elmer Brown (1909–1971) 
 Frank J. Brown (1956–2020), sculptor
 Frederick J. Brown (1945–2012), painter
 Larry Poncho Brown (born 1962)
 Manuelita Brown, sculptor
 Robert Brown (c. 1936 – 2007), cartoonist
 Beverly Buchanan (1940–2015), painter, sculptor
 Selma Burke (1900–1995), sculptor
 Calvin Burnett (1921–2007), book illustrator
 Pauline Powell Burns (1872–1912), painter
 John Bush (?–1754), powder horn carver
 Bisa Butler (born 1973), quilter
 Robert Butler (1943–2014), painter

C–D
 Frank Calloway (1915–2014)
 E. Simms Campbell (1906–1971), cartoonist
Allen 'Big Al' Carter (1947–2008)
 Fred Carter (born 1938), cartoonist
 Bernie Casey (1939–2017), painter
 Elizabeth Catlett (1915–2012), sculptor and printmaker
 Nick Cave (born 1959), performance artist
 Michael Ray Charles (born 1967), painter
 Barbara Chase-Riboud (born 1936), sculptor
 Jamour Chames (born 1989), painter
 Don Hogan Charles (1938–2017), photographer
Caitlin Cherry (born 1987), painter and sculptor
 Claude Clark (1915–2001), painter and printmaker
 Edward Clark (1926–2019), painter
 Sonya Clark (born 1967), textile and multimedia artist
 Willie Cole (born 1955), painter
 Robert Colescott (1925–2009), painter
 Eldzier Cortor (1916–2015), artist and printmaker
Pamela Council (born 1986), multidisciplinary artist, sculptor
 Ernest Crichlow (1914–2005), social realist artist
 Allan Crite (1910–2007), painter 
 Njideka Akunyili Crosby (born 1983), painter
 Emilio Cruz (1938–2004), painter
 Frank E. Cummings III (born 1938), woodworker
 Michael Cummings (born 1945), textile artist
 Ulysses Davis (1913–1990), sculptor
 Bing Davis (born 1937), potter and graphic artist
Charles C. Dawson (1889–1981) illustrator, painter, and printmaker
 Roy DeCarava (1919–2009), photographer
 Beauford Delaney (1901–1979), painter
 Joseph Delaney (1904–1991)
Xiomara De Oliver (born 1967), Canadian-born American painter.
Woody De Othello (born 1991), ceramicist, painter
 Louis Delsarte (1944–2020), artist
 Joseph Clinton Devillis (1878–1912), painter
 Thornton Dial (1928–2016)
 Terry Dixon (born 1969), painter and multimedia artist
 Jeff Donaldson (1932–2004), painter and critic
 Aaron Douglas (1899–1979), painter
 Emory Douglas (born 1943), Black Panther artist
 John E. Dowell Jr. (born 1941), printmaker, etcher, lithographer, and painter
 David Driskell (1931–2020), artist and scholar
 Robert Seldon Duncanson (1821–1872), Hudson River School
 Edward Dwight (born 1933) sculptor, painter, author

E–H
 Walter Edmonds (1938– 2011), muralist
 William Edmondson (1874–1951), folk art sculptor
 Allan L. Edmunds (born 1949), printmaker
 Mel Edwards (born 1937), sculptor
Janiva Ellis (born 1987), painter
 Walter Ellison (1899–1977), painter
 Minnie Evans (1892–1987), folk artist 
 Lola Flash (born 1959), photographer
 LaToya Ruby Frazier (born 1982), photographer 
 Meta Vaux Warrick Fuller (1877–1968), artist
 Ellen Gallagher (born 1965)
 Reginald Gammon (1921-2005), painter, printmaker, activist
 Melvino Garretti (born 1946)
 Theaster Gates (born 1973), sculptor, ceramicist, and performance artist
 Reginald K (Kevin) Gee (born 1964), painter
 Herbert Gentry (1919–2003), painter
 Wilda Gerideau-Squires (born 1946), photographer
 Robert A. Gilbert (c. 1870 – 1942), nature photographer
 Leah Gilliam (born 1967), media artist and filmmaker
 Sam Gilliam (1933–2022), painter 
 Russell T. Gordon (1936–2013), printmaker
 Billy Graham (1935–1999), comic book artist
 Lonnie Graham, photographer and installation artist
 Deborah Grant (born 1968), painter
 Todd Gray (born 1954), photographer, installation and performance artist
 Leamon Green (born 1959)
 Renee Green (born 1959), installation artist
 Mario Gully, comic book artist
 Tyree Guyton (born 1955)
 Ed Hamilton (born 1947), sculptor
 Patrick Earl Hammie (born 1981), painter
 David Hammons (born 1943), artist
 Trenton Doyle Hancock (born 1974)
 Austin Hansen (1910–1996), photographer
 John Wesley Hardrick (1891–1948), painter 
 Edwin Harleston (1882–1931), painter
 Elise Forrest Harleston (1891–1970), photographer
 Jerry Harris (1945–2016), sculptor
 John T. Harris (1908-1972), painter, printmaker, educator
 Kira Lynn Harris (born 1963), multidisciplinary
 Lawrence Harris (born 1937), painter
Ilana Harris-Babou (born 1991), sculptor and installation artist
 Marren Hassenger (born 1947), sculptor, installation, performance
 Palmer Hayden (1893–1973), painter
 Donté K. Hayes (b. 1975), ceramicist
 Barkley Hendricks (1945–2017), painter
Nestor Hernández (1961–2006), photographer
 George Herriman (1880–1944), cartoonist
 LaToya M. Hobbs (born 1988) printmaker, painter, mixed media artist 
 Alvin Hollingsworth (1928–2000), illustrator, painter
 Humbert Howard (1905 or 1915-1990), painter, ceramicist
 William Howard (active 19th century), American woodworker and craftsman
 Bryce Hudson (born 1979), painter, sculptor
 Julien Hudson (1811–1844), painter, sculptor
 David Huffman (born 1963), painter
 Edward Ellis Hughes (1940-2017), painter
 Richard Hunt (born 1935), sculptor
 Clementine Hunter (1886/7–1988), folk artist

J–O

 Wadsworth Jarrell (born 1929), painter, sculptor
 Oliver Lee Jackson (born 1935), painter, sculptor, printmaker, educator
 Tomashi Jackson (born 1980), multimedia artist, painter, videographer, textile-maker and sculptor
 Steffani Jemison (born 1981), performance artist, video artist
 Wilmer Angier Jennings (1910–1990), printmaker, painter, jeweler
 Annette P. Jimerson (born 1966), painter
 Joshua Johnson (c. 1763 – c. 1824), portrait painter and folk artist
 LeRoy Johnson  (born 1937), multidisciplinary artist
 Malvin Gray Johnson (1896–1934), painter
 Martina Johnson-Allen (born 1947), painter, sculptor, and printmaker, educator
 Rashid Johnson (born 1977), conceptual artist
 Sargent Johnson (1888–1967), sculptor 
 William H. Johnson (1902–1970)
 Calvin B. Jones (1934–2010), painter, muralist
 Ida E. Jones, painter
 Jennie C. Jones (born 1968), multidisciplinary
 Lois Mailou Jones (1905–1998), painter
 Lawrence A. Jones (1910–1996), artist, teacher
Samuel Levi Jones (born 1978), painter, assemblage artist 
 Seitu Jones (born 1951), multidisciplinary, sculptor
 Eddie Jack Jordan (1925–1999), artist, teacher
 Ronald Joseph (1910–1992), artist, teacher, and printmaker
 Titus Kaphar (born 1976), painter
 Richard Gordon Kendall (1933–2008), Texas-based outsider artist
 Autumn Knight (born 1980), interdisciplinary artist working with performance, installation, and text
 Gwendolyn Knight (1914–2005), artist
 Jacob Lawrence (1917–2000), painter
 Deana Lawson (born 1979), photographer
 Carolyn Lazard (born 1987), conceptual artist
 Hughie Lee-Smith (1915–1999), artist
 Simone Leigh (born 1967), sculpture, ceramics
 Edmonia Lewis (c. 1843 – 1879), artist
 Nate Lewis (born 1985), visual artist
 Norman Lewis (1909–1979), painter
 Joe Louis Light (1934–2005), painter and sculptor
 Glenn Ligon (born 1960), painter
 James Little (born 1952), painter, curator
 Willie Little (born 1961), multimedia artist, painter, sculptor, author
 Llanakila, artist, painter, digital illustrator, and digital artist
 Edward L. Loper, Sr. (1916–2011), painter
 Whitfield Lovell (born 1960), artist
 Alvin D. Loving (1935–2005), artist
 Eric N. Mack (born 1987), painter, multi-media installation artist, and sculptor
 Gwendolyn Ann Magee (1943–2011), artist, quilter
 Clarence Major (born 1936), painter
 Ajuan Mance, visual artist, professor
 Kerry James Marshall (born 1955), painter
 Eugene J. Martin (1938–2005), painter
 Louise Martin (1911–1995), photographer
 Richard Mayhew (born 1934), Afro-Native American, landscape painter
 Valerie Maynard (born 1937), sculptor, printmaker, painter
 Ealy Mays (born 1959), painter
 William McBride (artist) (1912–2000), artist, designer and collector
 Howard McCalebb (born 1947), artist
 Corky McCoy, illustrator
 Charles McGee, (1924–2021) painter
 Charles McGill (1964–2017), artist, educator
 Julie Mehretu (born 1970), painter, printmaker
 Troy Michie (born 1985), collage artist, painter, interdisciplinary installation artist, and sculptor
 Nicole Miller (born 1982), video artist
 Joe Minter (born 1943) sculptor, creator of African Village in America
 Dean Mitchell (born 1957), painter
 Scipio Moorhead (active 1770s), painter
 Barbara Tyson Mosley (born 1950), abstract painter
Archibald Motley (1891–1981), painter
Zora J. Murff (born 1987), photographer
 Wangechi Mutu (born 1972) painter, sculptor
 Gus Nall (1919–1995), painter
Senga Nengudi (born 1943), sculptor, performance artist
 Harold Newton (1934–1994), artist
 Lorraine O'Grady (born 1934), conceptual artist
 Turtel Onli (born 1952), cartoonist
 Jackie Ormes (1911–1985), cartoonist
 John Outterbridge (1933–2020), assemblage artist
 Joe Overstreet (1933–2019), artist

P–S
 Jennifer Packer (born 1985), painter
 Gordon Parks (1912–2006), photographer, director
 Cecelia Pedescleaux (born 1945), quilter
 Janet Taylor Pickett (born 1948), mixed media artist
 Delilah Pierce (1904–1992), artist
 Earle M. Pilgrim (1923–1976), artist
 Howardena Pindell (born 1943), painter
 Jerry Pinkney (1939–2021), illustrator
 Adrian Piper (born 1948), conceptual artist
 Rose Piper (1917–2005), painter and textile designer
 Horace Pippin (1888–1946), painter
 P. H. Polk (1898–1984), photographer
Stephanie Pogue (1944–2002), printmaker
 Carl Robert Pope (born 1961), photographer
 William Pope.L  (born 1955) conceptual artist
 Charles Ethan Porter (1847/49–1923) painter
 Harriet Powers (1837–1910), folk artist
 Walter Price (artist) (born 1989), painter
 Martin Puryear (born 1941), sculptor
 Mavis Pusey (1928–2019), abstract painter
 Bob Ragland (1938–2021), painter and sculptor
 Patrick H. Reason (1816–1898)
 Earle Wilton Richardson (1912–1935), artist
 Taft Richardson Jr. (1943–2008), folk artist
 Faith Ringgold (born 1930), painter
 Haywood Rivers (1922–2001), painter
 Amber Robles-Gordon, installation artist
 Arthur Rose Sr. (1921–1995), multidisciplinary
 Bayeté Ross Smith (born 1976), photographer
 Alison Saar (born 1956), artist
 Betye Saar (born 1926), artist
 Synthia Saint James (born 1949) painter
 Charles L. Sallée Jr. (1923–2006), painter
 Reginald Sanders (1921–2001), visual artist
 Raymond Saunders (born 1934), painter
 Augusta Savage (1892–1962), sculptor
 Dread Scott (born 1965), performance, photography, installation, screen-printing and video
 John T. Scott (1940–2007), artist
 Joyce J. Scott (born 1948), sculptor
 Lorenzo Scott (born 1934), painter
 William Edouard Scott (1884–1964), painter
 Charles Searles (1937-2004), painter, sculptor
 Charles Sebree (1914–1985), painter
 Gail Shaw-Clemons, printmaker,  educator
 Thomas Sills (1914–2000), painter
 Gary Simmons (born 1964), artist
 Lorna Simpson (born 1960), artist
 Merton Simpson (1928–2013), painter
 William Simpson (1818–1872), portrait painter
 Ferrari Sheppard (born 1983), painter 
 Amy Sherald (born 1973), painter
Carroll Sockwell (1943–1992), abstract painter
Jeff Sonhouse (born 1968), painter
 Cauleen Smith (born 1967), filmmaker
 Leslie Smith III (born 1985), painter
 Vincent D. Smith (1929–2003), painter and printmaker
 William E. Smith (1913–1997), painter and printmaker
 Gilda Snowden (1954–2014)
 Mitchell Squire (born 1958), American installation artist, sculptor and performance artist
 Raymond Steth (1916–1997)
 Renee Stout (born 1958), artist
 Thelma Johnson Streat (1911–1959) American painter, dancer, educator
 Martine Syms (born 1988), artist

T–Z
 Henry Ossawa Tanner (1859–1937), artist
 Ron Tarver (born 1957), photographer, artist, and educator
 Margaret Taylor-Burroughs (1915–2010)
 Alma Thomas (1891–1978), painter 
 Hank Willis Thomas (born 1976), photographer
 Mickalene Thomas (born 1971), painter and installation artist
 Bob Thompson (1937–1966), painter
 Mildred Thompson (1935–2003), abstract painter, printmaker and sculptor
 Dox Thrash (1892–1962), printmaker, sculptor 
 Bill Traylor (1856–1949)
 Henry Taylor (born 1958), painter
Yvonne Edwards Tucker (born 1941), potter
Adejoke Tugbiyele (born 1977), sculptor, multidisciplinary artist
 Morrie Turner (1923–2014), cartoonist
 James Van Der Zee (1886–1983), photographer 
 Kara Walker (born 1969), artist 
 William Walker (1927–2011), Chicago muralist
 Eugene Warburg, (1825–1859), sculptor
 Laura Wheeler Waring (1887–1948), painter
 E. M. Washington (born 1962), printmaker and counterfeiter
Cullen Washington, Jr. (born 1972) abstract painter. 
 James W. Washington, Jr. (1908–2000), painter and sculptor
 Howard N. Watson (1929–2022), watercolor painter
 Richard J. Watson (B. 1946), painter, printmaker 
 Lewis Watts
 Carrie Mae Weems (born 1953), photographer
 Pheoris West (1950–2021)
 Charles Wilbert White (1918–1979), muralist
 Fo Wilson, Interdisciplinary artist and designer
 Jack Whitten (1939–2018), painter
 Kehinde Wiley (born 1977), painter
 Gerald Williams (artist) (born 1941), painter
 William T. Williams (born 1942), painter
 Deborah Willis (born 1948), photographer
 Ellis Wilson (1899–1977), painter
 Fred Wilson (born 1954), conceptual artist
 John Woodrow Wilson (1922–2015), sculptor
 Beulah Woodard (1895–1955), sculptor
 Hale Woodruff (1900–1980), painter
 Richard Wyatt, Jr. (born 1955), painter, muralist
 Richard Yarde (1939–2011), watercolorist
 Joseph Yoakum (1890–1972), self-taught landscape artist
Kenneth Victor Young (1933–2017), painter, designer, educator
 Purvis Young (1943–2010), artist

Artist groups

 The Highwaymen
 AfriCOBRA
 Where We At
 Spiral (arts alliance)

See also

 Harlem Renaissance
 African-American art
 The Quilts of Gees Bend
 Black Arts Movement
 List of American artists before 1900
 List of American artists 1900 and after

References

African-American visual artists
African-American visual artists
 
Visual artists
African American
Lists of artists lists